Gayashan Nawananda (born 25 March 1990) is a Sri Lankan physician, politician and Member of Parliament.

Nawananda was born on 25 March 1990. He has a degree in medicine from the Rajarata University of Sri Lanka. He was Chief Medical Officer at Hambegamuwa Regional Hospital.

Nawananda contested the 2020 parliamentary election as a Sri Lanka People's Freedom Alliance electoral alliance candidate in Monaragala District and was elected to the Parliament of Sri Lanka.

References

1990 births
Alumni of the Rajarata University of Sri Lanka
Living people
Members of the 16th Parliament of Sri Lanka
Sinhalese physicians
Sinhalese politicians
Sri Lankan Buddhists
Sri Lanka People's Freedom Alliance politicians
Sri Lanka Podujana Peramuna politicians